Kim M. Robak (born October 4, 1955) is an American lawyer, lobbyist and retired politician from Nebraska. She is a member of the Democratic Party.

Robak was appointed the 35th lieutenant governor of Nebraska by Governor Ben Nelson, following resignation of incumbent Maxine B. Moul in 1993. She was re-elected in 1994, ultimately serving from October 1993 to January 1999. Previously, she served as Chief of Staff to Governor Nelson (1991–1992) and Legal Counsel to Governors Nelson, Kay Orr and Bob Kerrey (1985–1991).

She is currently a partner of Mueller Robak LLC. Previously she was the Vice President for External Affairs and Corporation Secretary for the University of Nebraska (1999–2004). She is also one of the board of Directors in Fiserv Inc.

Her mother was Jennie Robak who served in the Nebraska Legislature.

See also
List of female lieutenant governors in the United States

References

 (Ruth Mueller Robak LLC)
 Women in power in Nebraska
 Profile

External links

1955 births
Chiefs of staff to United States state governors
Lieutenant Governors of Nebraska
Living people
Nebraska Democrats
Women in Nebraska politics
People from Columbus, Nebraska
University of Nebraska–Lincoln alumni
21st-century American women